Hollamby is a surname. Notable people with the surname include:

Brent Hollamby (born 1964), New Zealand wrestler
David Hollamby (1945–2016), British Governor of Saint Helena
Shaun Hollamby (born 1965), British auto racing driver and race team owner